Devi Ahilya Bai Holkar Airport  is an international airport serving the city of Indore, Madhya Pradesh, India. According to the statistics released by the Airports Authority of India (AAI), the agency responsible for the maintenance and management of the airport, it was the 18th busiest airport in India by passenger traffic in the year 2018-19. The airport is named after Maharani Ahilya Bai Holkar of Indore, belonging to the Holkar dynasty of the Maratha Empire. Since 24 March 2018, it has started operations 24*7 with night landing facilities.

History
The Holkar State Administration, after consulting Nevill Vintcent of Messrs Tata and Sons (Aviation Department), selected the Bijasan site for the construction of the airport in 1935. Air services from Indore to Gwalior, Delhi and Mumbai began in July 1948. The airport was handed over to the Government of India in April 1950 under the Central Financial Integration Scheme. A new runway measuring 5,600 feet in length was completed by March 1966 at a cost of ₹15 lakh to accommodate larger aircraft. Night landing facilities were also provided. The Ministry of Civil Aviation has given its approval to the airport for operating international flights making it the first airport in Madhya Pradesh to do so.

Structure
The main apron has space for one-B737, four-B737/A321, four-ATR72 and one-Q400 aircraft simultaneously. MPFC Flying Club is at the south end of the runway; its apron has space for four-C172 aircraft simultaneously. Indore's sole runway 07/25 is 2,750 metres long and 45 metres wide.

The airfield is equipped with night landing facilities and a CAT-1 Instrument Landing System (ILS) (on Runway 25 only) as well as navigational facilities like DVOR/DME and an NDB. The runway is being extended as a part of the expansion plan for the airport.

Terminals 

Indore's new expandable integrated terminal building was inaugurated on 14 February 2012.
The new terminal has modern escalators and a high-tech baggage handling system. It caters to the movement of 96 flights every day. In preparation towards the proposed international operations, it will have 16 check-in counters, 16 immigration counters (four for departure and 12 for arrivals) and four counters for customs, apart from 569 CCTVs and X-ray machines for security.

There are three aerobridges serving the airport. The terminal has one lift and one escalator conveyor belt for baggage. As per the international standards, it has two ATMs (01 SBI and 01 Union Bank of India), shopping stalls and a food court. The airport is under an expansion stage. A new terminal adjoining the current terminal, along with an airport hotel and a convention center, are planned at the airport site. The completion of the expansion will turn the customs airport into a fully-fledged international one.

Airlines and destinations

Statistics

Future
The plan has been approved by the Ministry of Civil Aviation.

Awards
The airport was adjudged as the Best Airport in under 20 lakh (2 million) annual passenger footfall category in Asia-Pacific region in the Airports Council International (ACI)'s Airport Service Quality (ASQ) survey's rankings for the year 2017. The World Book of Records, UK, bestowed the Worlds Standardisation Certification to the airport for the achievement of ACI Award 2017 on 9 April 2018.

See also
 Holkar
 Indore State
 Maratha Empire
 Raja Bhoj Airport, Bhopal
 Jabalpur Airport
 Gwalior Airport
 List of airports in India
 List of the busiest airports in India

References

External links 
Indore Airport - AAI website

Buildings and structures in Indore
Transport in Indore
Airports in Madhya Pradesh
International airports in India
Airports established in 1948
1948 establishments in India
20th-century architecture in India